The men's marathon at the 2022 Commonwealth Games, as part of the athletics programme, was held in Victoria Square, Birmingham on 30 July 2022.

Field
Athletics Weekly named the favourite as the Tanzanian Alphonce Simbu, who finished third at the 2017 World Athletics Championships and had a season best of 2:06:20. Kenya's Jonathan Korir held the fastest personal best in the field; 2:04:32 achieved in Amsterdam in 2021 but his best time for 2022 was 2:08:04 at the Tokyo Marathon on 6 March. Ugandan Victor Kiplangat ran 2:05:09 in Hamburg which gave him the fastest season best in the field. Dewi Griffiths, Stephen Scullion and Motlokoa Nkhaunutlane all had personal bests under 2:10 while the sole Englishman, Jonny Mellor had run 2:10:46 in the trials for the games in Manchester. Other runners in the field included Australians Andrew Buchanan and Liam Adams who had personal bests of 2:12:23 and 2:10:48, respectively, Lesotho runners Lebenya Nkoka and Tsepo Mathibelle and Norther Irish runner Kevin Seaward. Paul Pollock was due to race but pulled out due to injury before the start. Athletics Weekly predicted a top three finish of Simbu, Korir and Kiplangat in times of 2:09:45, 2:09:50 and 2:10:15, respectively. Athletics Weekly noted a lack of "quality of depth" in the field while suggesting that Kenya had struggled to find athletes to compete.

Records
Prior to this competition, the existing World and Games records were as follows:

Schedule
The schedule was as follows:

All times are British Summer Time (UTC+1)

Results
The results were as follows:

References

Men's marathon
2022
2022 in men's athletics
Comm
2022 Commonwealth Games